66Sick is the sixth full-length album by death metal band Disbelief. It is the second to be released on Nuclear Blast and to gain worldwide distribution. Two of the songs, "Sick" and "Rewind It All", were made into singles with accompanying videos which are available for download on the band's official website here.

This album is also their first to make use of drop-tunings (although in this case they are tuned to A♯, not D).

Track listing

Bonus tracks
The first-edition release came with a slipcover and four bonus tracks, all of which are covers.

References

2005 albums
Disbelief albums
Nuclear Blast albums
Albums produced by Tue Madsen